Maria Iêda Guimarães (born 30 August 2000) is a Brazilian modern pentathlete. She competed in the women's event at the 2020 Summer Olympics.

References

External links
 

2000 births
Living people
Brazilian female modern pentathletes
Modern pentathletes at the 2020 Summer Olympics
Olympic modern pentathletes of Brazil
Place of birth missing (living people)
Modern pentathletes at the 2018 Summer Youth Olympics
21st-century Brazilian women